Llandyfaelog is a community located in Carmarthenshire, Wales.

According to the 2001 census the community has a population of 1,272, of which 71.88 percent are Welsh speaking. The population at the 2011 Census had increased to 1,304.

The community is bordered by the communities of Llangunnor, Llangyndeyrn, Kidwelly, St Ishmael, Llangain, and Carmarthen, all being in Carmarthenshire, and includes the villages of Idole, Croesyceiliog and Cwmffrwd.

Governance
Llandyfaelog has its own community council. For elections to Carmarthenshire County Council, Llandyfaelog was covered by the St Ishmael ward (including neighbouring St Ishmael), electing one county councillor.

Local councillor, Mair Stephens, died on 9 January 2022 after a long illness. She had been a member of Llandyfaelog Community Council for over 40 years and Independent county councillor since 2004, becoming deputy leader of the council.

Following a boundary review, from the May 2022 local elections Llandyfaelog became part of the Llangyndeyrn county ward which includes the neighbouring Llangyndeyrn community.

Notable residents
 Peter Williams (1723-1796), clergyman, publisher of Welsh-language Bibles
 Peter Bailey Williams (1763–1836), Anglican priest and amateur antiquarian.
 David Daniel Davis (1777-1841), physician and early obstetrician
 Sharon Morgan (born 1949), actress

References

External links

Communities in Carmarthenshire
Villages in Carmarthenshire